Leigh Sinton is a village in the Malvern Hills district of the county of Worcestershire, England, and one of the constituent places of the civil parish of Leigh. The village lies on the A4103 Worcester to Hereford road, about 5 miles out of Worcester, whilst Malvern is also about 5 miles away. It has a village pub, a small corner shop and a Chinese takeaway. The local pronunciation of Leigh is rhyming with "lie".

External links

 Parish Council web site

Villages in Worcestershire